Alonzo Arza Hinckley (April 23, 1870 – December 22, 1936) was a member of the Quorum of the Twelve Apostles of the Church of Jesus Christ of Latter-day Saints (LDS Church) from 1934 until his death.

Hinckley was born in Cove Fort, Utah Territory, to Ira Hinckley and Angeline Wilcox Noble. He married his wife Rose May Robison in 1892 in the Manti Temple. Hinckley served as an LDS Church missionary in the Netherlands.

On August 11, 1912, during a conference in Millard County, Utah, Hinckley was selected to be president of the newly formed Deseret Stake, which was located in the western half of Millard County, Utah.

Hinckley was ordained an apostle on October 11, 1934, to fill a vacancy in the Quorum of the Twelve Apostles created by elevation of David O. McKay to the First Presidency following the death of Anthony W. Ivins.

Hinckley died of stomach cancer on December 22, 1936, in Salt Lake City. He was buried at Salt Lake City Cemetery. He was succeeded in the Quorum of the Twelve by Albert E. Bowen.

Hinckley was the uncle of LDS Church president Gordon B. Hinckley.

References

1870 births
1936 deaths
American Mormon missionaries in the Netherlands
American general authorities (LDS Church)
Apostles (LDS Church)
Burials at Salt Lake City Cemetery
Deaths from cancer in Utah
Deaths from stomach cancer
Hinckley family
Latter Day Saints from Utah
People from Millard County, Utah